Jean-Claude Camille François Van Varenberg (born 18 October 1960), known professionally as Jean-Claude Van Damme, is a Belgian actor, martial artist, filmmaker, and fight choreographer. Born and raised in Brussels, Belgium, at the age of ten his father enrolled him in martial arts classes, which led to Van Damme participating in several competitions. With the desire of becoming an actor, he moved to the United States in 1982, where he did odd jobs and worked on several films, until he got his break as the lead in the martial arts film Bloodsport (1988).

Van Damme became a popular action film star and followed up with Cyborg (1989), Kickboxer (1989), Lionheart (1990), Death Warrant (1990), Double Impact (1991), Universal Soldier (1992), Nowhere to Run (1993), Hard Target (1993), Timecop (1994), Street Fighter (1994), Sudden Death (1995), The Quest (1996), Maximum Risk (1996), etc. After a decline, Van Damme returned to prominence with the critically acclaimed crime drama JCVD (2008).

Thereafter, Van Damme continued starring in more action films and playing supporting roles in The Expendables 2 (2012), the Kung Fu Panda franchise (2011–2016), the Kickboxer reboot film series (2016–2018), Minions: The Rise of Gru (2022), etc.

Early life and education
Van Damme was born Jean-Claude Camille François Van Varenberg, on 18 October 1960, in Berchem-Sainte-Agathe, Brussels, Belgium, the son of Eliana and Eugène Van Varenberg, who was an accountant and florist. His father is from Brussels and bilingual, and his mother is Flemish (Dutch-speaking). Van Damme was brought up Roman Catholic. His paternal grandmother was Jewish.

He began martial arts at the age of ten, enrolled by his father in a Shōtōkan karate school. His styles consist of Shōtōkan Karate and Kickboxing. He eventually earned his black belt in karate at 18. He started lifting weights to improve his physique, which eventually led to a Mr. Belgium bodybuilding title. At the age of 16, he took up ballet, which he studied for five years. According to Van Damme, ballet "is an art, but it's also one of the most difficult sports. If you can survive a ballet workout, you can survive a workout in any other sport." Later he took up both Taekwondo and Muay Thai.

Career

Early 1970s to 1980: Martial arts and first film appearance 

At the age of 12, Van Damme joined the Centre National de Karaté (National Center of Karate) under the guidance of Claude Goetz in Belgium. Van Damme trained for four years and he earned a spot on the Belgian Karate Team; he later trained in full-contact karate and kickboxing with Dominique Valera.

At the age of 15, Van Damme started his competitive karate career in Belgium. From 1976 to 1980, Van Damme compiled a record of 44 victories and 4 defeats in tournament and non-tournament semi-contact matches.

Van Damme was a member of the Belgium Karate Team when it won the European Karate Championship on 26 December 1979 at La Coupe François Persoons Karate Tournament in Brussels.

Van Damme placed second at the Challenge Coupe des Espoirs Karate Tournament (1st Trials). At the 3-day tournament, Van Damme defeated 25 opponents before losing in the finals to teammate Angelo Spataro.

On 8 March 1980, in Brussels, Belgium, Van Damme competed against his former teammate Patrick Teugels at the Forest National Arena on the undercard of the Dan Macaruso-Dominique Valera Professional Karate Association Light-Heavyweight World Championship bout. Prior to this match, Teugels had defeated Van Damme twice by decision, including a match for the Belgium Lightweight Championship. Van Damme had a 1977 victory over Teugels. Teugels was coming off an impressive showing at the World Association of Kickboxing Organizations World Championships four months earlier, and was favored by some to win this match. According to reports, and Patrick Teugels' own interview (with photos), Teugels lost to Van Damme by TKO in the 1st round. Teugels was kicked in the nose and was unable to continue as a result. In a 2013 interview, Van Damme called this fight his most memorable match.

Van Damme began his full-contact career in 1977, when Claude Goetz promoted the first ever full-contact karate tournament in Belgium.

From 1977 to 1982, Van Damme compiled a record of 18 victories (18 knockouts) and 1 defeat .

In 1979, he had an uncredited role in André Delvaux's Woman Between Wolf and Dog, a Belgian-French drama film starring Marie-Christine Barrault, and Rutger Hauer.

In 1980, Van Damme caught the attention of Professional Karate Magazine publisher and editor Mike Anderson and multiple European champion Geert Lemmens. Both men tabbed Van Damme as an upcoming prospect. Van Damme retired from competition in 1982.

During his early life, Van Damme sold flowers in restaurants, and got a loan to open a gym to save some money before his move to the United States.

1982 to 1988: Early works and breakthrough 
In 1982, Van Damme and childhood friend Michel Qissi moved to the United States in the hope of working as actors. They did a variety of jobs to support themselves. Their first job working on a film as extras in the hip hop dance film Breakin' (1984), made by Cannon Films. They are seen dancing in the background at a dance demonstration.

Around that time he developed a friendship with action martial art film star Chuck Norris. They started sparring together, and Van Damme started to work as a bouncer at a bar named Woody's Wharf, owned by Norris.

In the 1984 action film Missing in Action starring Norris, which was also released by Cannon Films, Van Damme is credited in the stunt team crew. That same year he also had a role in the comedy short film Monaco Forever.

On 2 May 1986, Corey Yuen's martial arts film No Retreat, No Surrender  premiered in Los Angeles.  It was Van Damme's first sizeable role when he was cast as the Russian villain. It starred Kurt McKinney, and was released through New World Pictures. McKinney performs as Jason Stillwell, a U.S. teenager who learns karate from the spirit of Bruce Lee. Stillwell uses these lessons to defend his martial arts dojo against a Soviet martial artist played by Van Damme. He was set to star in No Retreat, No Surrender 2, but backed out.

Van Damme worked for director John McTiernan for the film Predator (1987) as an early (eventually abandoned) version of the titular alien, before being removed and replaced by Kevin Peter Hall. As the first choice to play the titular Predator character, with the intent that he would use his martial arts skills to make the alien an agile, ninja-like hunter, but after few days shot, he left the film. It was reported that Van Damme constantly complained about the monster suit being too hot and causing him to pass out; he allegedly also voiced reservations about only appearing on camera in the suit. Additionally, it became apparent that a more physically imposing actor was needed to make the creature appear threatening against the team of soldiers. The role eventually went to Kevin Peter Hall. After Predator was a success, Van Damme said that he appreciated the movie and that he had no regrets about missing that role.

Van Damme's breakout film was Bloodsport, which opened on 26 February 1988, based on the alleged true story of Frank Dux. It was shot on a $1.5-million budget for Cannon. The film is about U.S. Army Captain Frank Dux (played by Van Damme), trained from his youth in the ways of ninjutsu by Senzo Tanaka, who honors his mentor by taking the place of Tanaka's deceased son Shingo in the illegal martial-arts tournament Kumite in Hong Kong. It became a U.S. box-office hit in the spring of 1988. Producer Mark Di Salle said he was looking for "a new martial arts star who was a ladies' man, [but Van Damme] appeals to both men and women. He's an American hero who fights for justice the American way and kicks the stuffing out of the bad guys." Also in 1988, Van Damme played another Russian villain, in Black Eagle, opposite Sho Kosugi. In the film, Sho Kosugi is a martial artist and special operative for the U.S. government codenamed "Black Eagle", and summoned by his superiors after an F-111 carrying an experimental black ops laser tracking device was shot down over Malta by Russian forces.

1989 to 1999: International stardom 
After the success of Bloodsport, Cannon Films offered Van Damme the lead in Delta Force 2, American Ninja 3 or Cyborg, a cyperpunk martial arts film directed by Albert Pyun. Van Damme chose Cyborg which premiered in 1989. The film was a low budget box office success and led to two sequels, neither of which Van Damme appeared in.

Cannon used Van Damme again in Kickboxer released that same year. It was highly successful, returning over $50 million on a $3-million budget. The film started the Kickboxer franchise. Van Damme did not appear in any of the film's four sequels, though he did return as a different character in the reboot series.

In 1990 Van Damme starred in Death Warrant, the first script credit for David S. Goyer. Also that year he starred in Lionheart. Lionheart was directed by Sheldon Lettich who had co-written Bloodsport, and said the film was "the first movie to demonstrate that Van Damme was more than just a flash-in-the-pan "Karate Guy" who would never rise above simplistic low-budget karate movies." It also featured rear nudity from Van Damme which Lettich says "became a very memorable moment for the ladies in the audience, and for the gay guys as well. Showing off his butt (clothed or unclothed) almost became a signature trademark of his after that."

In 1991, Double Impact was released. Directed by Lettich, it features Van Damme in the dual role of Alex and Chad Wagner, estranged twin brothers fighting to avenge the deaths of their parents. Upon it’s opening it received mixed reviews. The Los Angeles Times said the film “delivers the goods”, while Variety didn’t like the plotline and predicted a flop. The film grossed $ 23,683,813 in it’s first 28 days.  It made a total of $30,102,717 in the US. Retrospective critics perceive it to be a fun action film, with good comical moments, and a good performance by Van Damme who plays two distinct characters.

In 1992, Van Damme starred in one of the biggest blockbusters of the year in the sci-fi action picture Universal Soldier directed by Roland Emmerich for Carolco.  Van Damme (as Luc Deveraux) and Dolph Lundgren (as Sergeant Andrew Scott) play U.S. soldiers during the Vietnam War who are sent to secure a village against North Vietnamese forces. However they end up shooting each other dead after Devereaux discovers that Scott has gone insane and has resorted to mutilating the villagers and barbarically cutting off their ears, taking an innocent girl and boy hostage. They are later reanimated in a secret Army project along with a large group of other previously dead soldiers and sent on a mission as GR operatives. At the 1992 Cannes Film Festival, Van Damme and Lundgren were involved in a verbal altercation that almost turned physical when both men pushed each other only to be separated, but it was believed to have only been a publicity stunt. Universal Soldier opened in theatres on 10 July 1992, a moderate success domestically with $36,299,898 in US ticket sales, but a major blockbuster worldwide, making over $65 million overseas, which earned the film a total of $102 million worldwide, on a $23 million budget.

Van Damme was considered to play Simon Phoenix in Demolition Man and was briefly considered for the role of Michael Cheritto in Heat. 

In 1993 Van Damme made a cameo in Last Action Hero, and starred in Nowhere To Run. The film was the first in a three-picture deal between Van Damme and Columbia Pictures and his fee was $3.5 million. Columbia said the film is "true to his audience and goes beyond his audience."

In 1994, he starred in Hard Target for Universal, the first American film from director John Woo. Also released that year he starred in Timecop, playing a time-traveling cop. Directed by Peter Hyams, the film was a huge success, grossing over $100 million worldwide, and remains his highest-grossing film in a lead role to date. Also that  year, Van Damme starred in Street Fighter, written and directed by Steven E. de Souza for Universal and based on the video game. It was poorly received critically. Though a commercial success, making approximately three times its production cost.

Van Damme and Hyams re-teamed for Universal' on Sudden Death released in 1995. Van Damme plays a French Canadian-born firefighter with the Pittsburgh Fire Bureau who suffered a personal crisis after he was unable to save a young girl from a house fire. Now removed from active duty, Darren has become demoted to being fire marshal for the Pittsburgh Civic Arena, where a gang of terrorists are holding U.S. Vice President and several other VIPs hostage in a luxury suite during a game.

In 1996, Van Damme starred and turned director for The Quest. That year, he appeared in the TV show Friends in the two-part episode "The One After the Superbowl". He also starred in Maximum Risk, the first American film directed by Ringo Lam, and their first collaboration.

Van Damme's first box office bomb since he became a star was Double Team (1997), a buddy film with basketball superstar Dennis Rodman. It was Hong Kong director Tsui Hark's American debut.

In 1998, he and Hark reunited on Knock Off. Also that year, Van Damme acted in the costume action film, Legionnaire. Despite a $35 million budget, it was not released theatrically in the US, only overseas.

In 1999, Van Damme starred in Universal Soldier: The Return, (1999), where he returns as Luc Deveraux. That year he also starred in Inferno.

2000s: Subsequent films 

Released in 2001, Replicant is the second collaboration between Van Damme and director Ringo Lam, and the fifth time that Van Damme has starred in a dual role. It co-stars Michael Rooker. Also that year he starred in The Order, directed by Sheldon Lettich, and written by Van Damme.

In 2002 he starred in Derailed.

In Hell is a 2003 American prison action film directed by Ringo Lam. It is the third collaboration between Van Damme and Lam. Van Damme plays an American working overseas in Magnitogorsk, Russia. That same year, Van Damme employed his dancing training in the music video for Bob Sinclar's "Kiss My Eyes".

His 2004 film was Wake of Death, an action film directed by Philippe Martinez. Ringo Lam was the original director, but he left the project after a few weeks of filming in Canada. It co-stars Simon Yam, Valerie Tian, Tony Schiena, etc.

In 2005, he played himself in the French film Narco.

In 2006, he starred in Second in Command directed by Simon Fellows, and The Hard Corps directed by Sheldon Lettich.

In 2007, played a small role in The Exam, a Turkish comedy-drama film directed by Ömer Faruk Sorak. Also that year he starred in Until Death. 

Van Damme returned to the mainstream with the limited theatrical release of the 2008 film JCVD, which received positive reviews. Time Magazine named Van Damme's performance in the film the second best of the year (after Heath Ledger's The Joker in The Dark Knight), having previously stated that Van Damme "deserves not a black belt, but an Oscar." Also in 2008, he starred in Isaac Florentine's The Shepherd: Border Patrol.

He then reprised his role as Luc Deveraux alongside Dolph Lundgren in the 2009 film Universal Soldier: Regeneration, directed by John Hyams. The film was released theatrically in the Middle East and Southeast Asia and directly to video in the United States and other parts of the world. Since its release, the film has received better than average reviews for a straight-to-DVD franchise sequel.

2010–present: Current work

In 2010, Van Damme directed himself in the barely released Full Love. That same year, he turned down the role of Gunner Jensen in the first instalment of The Expendables and the role went to Dolph Lundgren.

In 2011, Van Damme voiced Master Croc in the computer animation film Kung Fu Panda 2. In the film, Van Damme voices a character who helps the heroes of the previous film. That same year, he co-starred with Scott Adkins in Assassination Games. Also in 2011, he played a role in the French comedy Beur sur la ville. Also that year, Van Damme starred in his own reality TV show Behind Closed Doors. The show showcases his family life, his personal troubles, and an upcoming fight. Since 2009, Van Damme has been planning to make a comeback to fight former boxing Olympic gold-medalist Somluck Kamsing. The fight was a focal point in his ITV reality show Behind Closed Doors. The fight has been repeatedly postponed, with many critics doubting it will occur, especially due to the difficulty of booking the venue.

In 2012, he acted in the Russian comedy film named Rzhevsky Versus Napoleon, and U.F.O.  He starred in Dragon Eyes, Universal Soldier: Day of Reckoning, and Six Bullets. Also that year,  he starred as the main villain in The Expendables 2. The film series follows a mercenary group as they undertake a mission which evolves into a quest for revenge against a rival mercenary (Van Damme). The film was a success. it grossed over $310 million worldwide. Also that year, Van Damme was seen as part of Kam Sing's ring crew when Kam Sing fought against Jomhod Kiatadisak. He also appeared in commercials for Coors Light beer, showing him on a snow-covered mountain wearing a sleeveless denim jacket, and for the washing powder Dash. On 21 October 2012, Van Damme was honored with a life-size statue of himself in his hometown of Brussels. He told reporters during the unveiling, "Belgium is paying me back something, but really it's to pay back to the dream. So when people come by here, it is not Jean-Claude van Damme but it's a guy from the street who believed in something. I want the statue to represent that".

In 2013 Van Damme acted in the comedy Welcome to the Jungle. Also that year, he played the main villain in Enemies Closer, an American action thriller film directed by Peter Hyams. On 13 November 2013, Volvo Trucks released an advertisement on YouTube that shows Van Damme doing the splits while perched with each of his feet on the outer rearview mirrors of one semi-trailer truck and one box truck moving backwards, which Van Damme describes in the commercial as "the most epic of splits". The video quickly went viral around the web, receiving more than 11 million views in three days, 35 million in the first week. It was dubbed as The Epic Split.

Swelter is a 2014 American action film where he plays one of the leads. It stars Lennie James, and co-stars Grant Bowler, Josh Henderson, and Alfred Molina. James plays a sheriff in a small town who has a dark past that he can not remember, only to have to confront it when his ex-partners show up looking for stolen money they believe he has.

2015, he starred in the action thriller film Pound of Flesh, directed by Ernie Barbarash. Also that year, he had a supporting role in a Chinese superhero parody film.

In 2016, he returned to his voice role of Master Croc in the Kung Fu Panda franchise for the third installment. Also that year, he acted in Kickboxer: Vengeance directed by John Stockwell. It is a reboot of the original where Van Damme was the lead. That year he also played the lead in the tv serie Jean-Claude Van Johnson.

In 2017, he starred in Kill 'Em All, an action film directed by Peter Malota.

In 2018, he returned to his role in Kickboxer: Retaliation, a sequel to the reboot. That same year, he acted in Black Water. It co-stars Dolph Lundgren in the fifth collaboration between both actors as well as the first time they appear together as on-screen allies. In 22 August of that same year, he starred in Julien Leclercq's The Bouncer.

In 2019, Van Damme starred in We Die Young.

In 2021, Van Damme starred in The Last Mercenary.

In 2022, Van Damme voiced the character Jean-Clawed in the computer animation film Minions: The Rise of Gru.

Monument

In 2012, a statue of the actor was unveiled in Anderlecht, Belgium. The artwork, which depicts a younger incarnation of the Muscles from Brussels in one of his fighting poses from the movie Kickboxer, was commissioned to commemorate the 40th anniversary of the Westland Shopping complex. The unveiling took place on Boulevard Sylvain Dupuis and was attended by Van Damme, his parents, Wallonia-Brussels culture minister  and nearly 2,000 fans. Van Damme said the statue "represented the dream of a Brussels kid" and was "for all the children who want something bad", adding that "if you believe in something strongly enough, it can come true".

In 2019, a Van Damme monument was mounted in the Vandam village of Qabala, Azerbaijan, due to the similarity of the village name and Van Damme's name. The actor subsequently published a post on his Facebook account, thanking those responsible.

Controversies

Lawsuit and fight record controversy
In 1997, Frank Dux, the martial artist whom Van Damme portrayed in Bloodsport, filed a lawsuit against Van Damme for $50,000 for co-writing and consultation work Dux did on the 1996 film The Quest. According to the lawsuit, Dux also accused Van Damme of lying to the public about his martial arts fight record, stating that when Dux tutored Van Damme while Van Damme was laying carpet for a living, Van Damme exhibited a lack of martial arts skills. Van Damme's lawyer, Martin Singer, responded, "There are records to document his martial arts acclaim. Why, just look at his movies; he didn't get those roles on his acting ability! He's the one who does those splits on chairs. He doesn't have a stuntman to do that."

Steven Seagal incident
In 2008, actor Sylvester Stallone declared to the British magazine FHM that "At a party in my home in Miami in 1997, Van Damme was tired of Steven Seagal claiming he could kick his ass so he offered Seagal outside into my back yard." According to Stallone, Seagal made his excuses and left while Van Damme tracked him down at a nightclub and challenged him again. Stallone finished by stating "Van Damme was too strong. Seagal wanted none of it."

Chuck Zito incident
Tensions arose between Van Damme and bodyguard/stuntman Chuck Zito when Zito began dating Van Damme's estranged wife Darcy LaPier. Zito was reportedly unhappy about LaPier's claim in a divorce action that Van Damme had abused her. On 6 February 1998, the New York Daily News reported that Van Damme had been punched by Zito the previous night at the Scores strip club in Manhattan, New York. Zito, who had previously bodyguarded Van Damme and did stunts on the film Nowhere to Run, recalled the incident in his 2002 autobiography Street Justice, claiming that he suffered a broken hand as a result of striking Van Damme several times after Van Damme made disparaging remarks about him to a club bouncer, who then relayed the comments to Zito. Van Damme denied in an appearance on Inside Edition days after the incident that he had been struck by Zito and challenged Zito to a fight. Zito has stated: "I hope we can be friends again, but he was abusive. Some people will take that kind of abuse. I am not one of them."

Kadyrov event
In October 2011, Van Damme, along with other celebrities including Hilary Swank, Vanessa-Mae and Seal attracted criticism from human rights groups for attending an event in Russian federal subject Chechnya's capital Grozny on the 35th birthday of Chechen president Ramzan Kadyrov on 5 October. Human rights groups, who had urged the celebrities to cancel their appearances because of abuses carried out under Kadyrov, criticised the celebrities for attending the event. Human Rights Watch released a statement which said, "Ramzan Kadyrov is linked to a litany of horrific human rights abuses. It's inappropriate for stars to get paid to party with him [...] And getting paid to be part of such a lavish show in Chechnya trivializes the suffering of countless victims of human rights abuses there."

Public image and influence
In the French-speaking world, Van Damme is well known – and often mocked – for the picturesque aphorisms that he delivers on a wide range of topics (personal well-being, spirituality, the environment, women, dogs, his ability to crack walnuts with his buttocks, his realization that Christianity is flawed based on the fact that "snakes are nice" and "apples contain pectin which is anti-cholesterol", etc.) in a sort of Zen franglais. He was deeply affected by his depiction in the media and the frequent derisive use of his interviews in comedy shows in the early 2000s, becoming increasingly reluctant to grant new interviews in French. He later explained that he was trying to communicate bits of his hard-earned wisdom to young uneducated people dreaming of success, like he used to be himself, and had to struggle with the time constraints of TV, with his difficulties reacquainting with the French language, and with the effects of jet lag, often resulting in a clumsy, haphazard delivery. His public image in the French-speaking world became a major theme of the 2008 movie J.C.V.D. (directed by Mabrouk El Mechri, a fan of Van Damme's from his childhood, who sought to rehabilitate him by exploring those issues head-on).

The original video game Mortal Kombat was conceived as a fighting game based on Van Damme. Creators Ed Boon and John Tobias had originally wanted to star Van Damme himself in the game. That fell through as he had a prior deal for another game under the auspices of the Sega Genesis platform. Ed Boon and John Tobias eventually decided to create a different character for the game named Johnny Cage, who is modelled after Van Damme, primarily from Van Damme's appearance and outfit in the martial arts film Bloodsport. In the German version of the Donkey Kong 64 website, DK's greatest hero is Jean-Claude van Kong.

Renowned UFC fighter Georges St-Pierre was inspired by Van Damme, and described fighting him in the film Kickboxer: Vengeance as "a dream come true".

In January 2017, Van Damme featured in an Ultra Tune television advert which was part of a controversial series of ads. Two women were confronted in a car park by a gang of youths in a threatening manner, Van Damme appears to defend them and then the mood lightens and they take pictures with the star.

In October 2020, Van Damme rescued a three-month-old chihuahua, saving her from euthanasia after a legal tussle between Norway and Bulgaria.

Personal life
By the mid-1990s, the stress of the constant filming and promotion of his films, as Van Damme explains, led him to develop a cocaine habit, on which he spent up to $10,000 a week, and consuming up to 10 grams per day by 1996. He was arrested for driving under the influence in 1999. Attempts at drug rehabilitation were unsuccessful, and he resorted to resolve his addiction via quitting cold turkey and exercise. In 1998, he was diagnosed with bipolar disorder. In 2011, he discussed the condition on the British reality show Behind Closed Doors, saying, "Sometimes you're gonna like me, and sometimes you're gonna hate me. But what can I do? I'm not perfect ... I'm an extreme bipolar, and I'm taking medication for this ... When I was young, I was suffering those swing moods. In the morning, the sky was blue [when I was] going to school, and to me, the sky was black. I was so sad."

Van Damme has been married five times to four different women. Until 1992 he was married to his third wife, bodybuilder Gladys Portugues, with whom he has two children, Kristopher (born 1987) and Bianca Brigitte (born 1990).) He had begun an affair with actress Darcy LaPier, whom he married in February 1994. From this marriage, the couple has a son named Nicholas (born 10 October 1995). That same year he had an affair with his Street Fighter co-star Kylie Minogue during filming in Thailand. LaPier, who was pregnant with their son at the time, did not become aware of the affair until Van Damme publicly admitted it in 2012.

Van Damme had been in a decade long relationship with Model Alena Kaverina, though still married to Gladys Portugues. Kaverina was born in Ukraine; Van Damme visited the country during the Russian invasion of Ukraine to show his support.

Filmography

Film

Television

Music videos

Video games

Awards and nominations

Championships and accomplishments 
Mr. Belgium bodybuilding Championships (1976 Gold)

Belgium Karate Lightweight Championships (1977 Gold)

Belgium Karate team European Championships (1979 Gold)

Belgium Coupe des Espoirs Karate Tournament Championships (1980 Silver)

Semi-contact / light-contact record

Kickboxing record

Notes

References

Books cited
  (Wako)
  (PKA World Heavyweight Title)
  (Eku)

Further reading

External links

 
 

1960 births
Belgian bodybuilders
Belgian emigrants to the United States
Belgian male karateka
Belgian male kickboxers
Belgian Muay Thai practitioners
Belgian people of Jewish descent
Belgian Roman Catholics
Flemish male film actors
Living people
Middleweight kickboxers
People from Sint-Agatha-Berchem
People with bipolar disorder
Shotokan practitioners